The 2009 Caversham International Tennis Tournament was a professional tennis tournament played on indoor carpet courts. It was the second edition of the tournament which was part of the 2009 ATP Challenger Tour. It took place in Saint Brélade, Jersey, Great Britain between 9 and 15 November 2009.

ATP entrants

Seeds

 Rankings are as of November 2, 2009.

Other entrants
The following players received wildcards into the singles main draw:
  Colin Fleming
  James Marsalek
  David Rice
  Daniel Smethurst

The following players received entry from the qualifying draw:
  Daniel Cox
  Robin Haase
  Henri Kontinen
  Roman Valent

Champions

Singles

 Jarkko Nieminen def.  Stéphane Robert, 4–6, 6–1, 7–5

Doubles

 Frederik Nielsen /  Joseph Sirianni def.  Henri Kontinen /  Jarkko Nieminen, 7–5, 3–6, [10–2]

External links
ITF search 
2009 Draws

Caversham International Tennis Tournament
Carpet court tennis tournaments
Tennis tournaments in Jersey
Caversham International Tennis Tournament
2009 in tennis